Dmitri Sukharev may refer to:
 Dmitri Sukharev (basketball)
 Dmitri Sukharev (footballer)